Shoreham was a station on the Wading River Extension on the Port Jefferson Branch of the Long Island Rail Road. This is an abandoned station just east of the intersection of North Country Road and Randall Road, along what is now access for Long Island Power Authority power lines.

History
The Wardenclyffe station was originally built in 1900 in close proximity to Nikola Tesla's wireless transmission station Wardenclyffe Tower. The station was built during the extension of the Port Jefferson Branch to Wading River, which was once slated to continue eastward and rejoin the Main Line at either Riverhead or Calverton. In 1910, the station's name was changed to Shoreham.

The line east of Port Jefferson was abandoned in 1938 and the station was torn down in 1950. The right-of-way is now owned by the Long Island Power Authority and used for power lines, but there are plans to create a rail trail for bicycling, running, and walking.

References

External links
Wading River Extension (Unofficial LIRR History.com)
Wading River Branch (Arrt's Arrchives)
Site of the former Shoreham Long Island Rail Road station (Road and Rail Pictures)
Wading River Extension (Trains Are Fun.com)
Shoreham Train Station, Tesla Tower and vicinity (Shoreham Historical Society)

Former Long Island Rail Road stations in Suffolk County, New York
Railway stations in the United States opened in 1900
Railway stations closed in 1938
1900 establishments in New York (state)
1938 disestablishments in New York (state)